The 2021 Florida Mayhem season was the Florida Mayhem's fourth season in the Overwatch League and the team's second season under head coach Kim "KuKi" Dae-kuk. After starting the regular season with a promising 4–1 record, as well as a midseason tournament appearance, the Mayhem went 1–10 in their final 11 games. The team failed to qualify for any other midseason tournaments and did not qualify for the season playoffs.

Preceding offseason

Roster changes 

The Mayhem entered free agency with seven free agents, two of which became free agents due to the Mayhem not exercising the option to retain the player for another year.

Acquisitions 
The Mayhem signed three players to their roster on December 11, 2020; new acquisitions included Baek "Checkmate" Seung-hun, a rookie damage player from Overwatch Contenders Korea team OZ Gaming, Son "OGE" Min-seok, a tank player and four-year veteran of the Overwatch League who played for the Los Angeles Gladiators in the 2020 season, and Kim "SLIME" Sung-jun, a support player who reached the Overwatch League Grand Finals in 2019 and 2020 with the Vancouver Titans and Seoul Dynasty, respectively.

Departures 
Five of the Mayhems's seven free agents did not return, one of whom signed with another team: tank player Koo "Fate" Pan-seung signed with the Shanghai Dragons on November 11, 2020. Additionally, damage player Ha "Sayaplayer" Jeong-woo retired from competitive Overwatch, while tank player Koo "Karayan" Pan-seung, support player Lee "Byrem" Seong-joo, and support player Choe "Kris" Jun-su did not sign with a team in the offseason.

Regular season 
The Mayhem began their 2021 season on April 17, playing against the Atlanta Reign in the May Melee qualifiers. They won their opener 1–3. Florida finished the qualifiers with a 3–1 record and advanced to the regional knockouts. After defeating the Toronto Defiant and the Washington Justice in the regional knockouts, the Mayhem advanced to the interregional tournament bracket. The team's first match in the double-elimination tournament was against the Shanghai Dragons. After a six-map series, which included a draw in one map, the Mayhem lost 2–3, sending them to the lower bracket of the tournament. In the first round of the lower bracket, Florida defeated the Chengdu Hunters 3–1. Their next match was again against the Dragons, as the Dragons fell to the lower bracket as well. Florida lost the match 0–3, eliminating them from the tournament.

After the strong start to the season, Florida struggled to continue their success. In the following tournament cycle, the June Joust, the Mayhem won only one of their three qualifier matches, failing to advance to the regional knockouts. In the Summer Showdown, the third tournament cycle of the season, the Mayhem began the qualifiers with two consecutive losses, putting them on a five-game losing streak. The poor performances by the team prompted the Mayhem to bench tank player Son "OGE" Min-seok and move damage player Baek "Checkmate" Seung-hun into the tank role. Florida Mayhem general manager Albert Yeh stated that the change was due to team's "poor results" since the May Melee. Florida won only more game in the season, finishing with a 5–11 record and did not qualify for the season playoffs.

Final roster

Standings

Game log

Regular season 

|2021 season schedule

References 

Florida Mayhem
Florida Mayhem
Florida Mayhem seasons